Placoptila is a genus of moths in the family Cosmopterigidae.

Species
Placoptila artionoma Meyrick, 1919
Placoptila choromima Meyrick, 1931
Placoptila cyanolychna Meyrick, 1911
Placoptila cyclas Meyrick, 1937
Placoptila electrica Meyrick, 1894
Placoptila lucicincta Meyrick, 1920
Placoptila resoluta (Diakonoff, 1948)
Placoptila semioceros (Meyrick, 1935)

References

Cosmopteriginae